Vintage is the third studio album from rapper Young Bleed, released under the name Young Bleed Carleone's. His next album Rise Thru da Ranks from Earner Tugh Capo was released under the name Young Bleed.

Track listing

 Born Kings 5:10
 Tribal X' Istence 3:22
 Kisses N' Hugs 6:23
 Da Don 4:56
 Murderous 11:20
 Da' Indo' Mission 1:03
 Out Dat' Dirty 5:32
 Bleed N' Tyme 5:22
 Whatchall' Mean 6:21
 N' Dis' World 3:14
 Take It E' Zeh' 4:20
 Out Da' Windo' 5:19

References

Hip hop albums by American artists
2002 albums